When the Red King Comes is the second album by the Elephant 6 band Elf Power. It is a concept album about the Red King's kingdom. The cover art is taken from a section of an imaginary map called “The Land of Make Believe”,  drawn in 1930 by Jaro Hess. A more complete version of the map can be seen in The Writer's Map: An Atlas of Imaginary Lands.

"Needles in the Camels Eyes" is a cover of the Brian Eno song.

Critical reception
Trouser Press wrote that "though still noisy, the improved sound coincides with a sharper focus in the songwriting (that's good) and the first hint of impending mythological obsessions (not so good)." The Chicago Tribune thought that "in Elf Power's hands, psychedelia is a means of transforming personal trauma into a twisted kind of triumph."

AllMusic wrote that "the fuzzy, lo-fi production is an Elephant 6 hallmark, but the unique instrumentation (electric horns, pump organs, even Nepalese percussion) and cryptic, stream-of-consciousness wordplay suggest something altogether different."

Track listing
All songs written by Andrew Rieger unless otherwise noted.
 "Step Through the Portal..."
 "...Into the Everlasting Time"
 "The Frightened Singers"
 "The Secret Ocean"
 "The Arrow Flies Close"
 "Icy Hands Will Never Melt Away"
 "When the Red King Comes"
 "The Separating Fault"
 "Spectators"
 "Introducing Cosmic Space" (Andrew Rieger, Bryan Helium)
 "The Bengal Parade"
 "Needles in the Camels Eyes" (Brian Eno, Phil Manzanera)
 "...The Silver Lake" (Laura Carter)
 "It's Been a Million Years"

Personnel
 Andrew Rieger - guitars, vocals, flute, zanzitophone, keyboards, bass, percussion
 Laura Carter - keyboards, vocals, Moog synthesizer, zanzithophone, loops
 Bryan Helium - bass, vocals, guitar, sitar, keyboards
 Aaron Wegelin - drums, vocals, percussion

References

1997 albums
Elf Power albums
Arena Rock Recording Company albums